The John Minor Dye Stone House is located at 9 South Children's Home Road east of Troy in Elizabeth Township, Miami County, Ohio. The property was listed on the National Register on 1983-07-07.

References

Houses on the National Register of Historic Places in Ohio
Houses completed in 1813
Houses in Miami County, Ohio
National Register of Historic Places in Miami County, Ohio
Stone houses in Ohio